Parorbiliopsis is a genus of fungi in the family Helotiaceae. The genus contains about 5 species.

References

Helotiaceae